CJS may refer to:
 Certified Journeyman Safecracker, an American trade qualification awarded to members of the National Safeman's Organization
 Corpus Juris Secundum, an encyclopedia of U.S. law
 Collège Jeanne-Sauvé, a high school in Winnipeg, Manitoba, Canada
 Ciudad Juárez International Airport, IATA airport code: CJS
 Callejeros, Argentine rock band
 Cairo Japanese School
 Casi Justicia Social, Argentine Rock band
 Criminal justice system
 Captain Jack Sparrow, the protagonist of the Pirates of the Caribbean film franchise
 CommonJS, a standardization project for JavaScript module ecosystem outside web browsers